Bethany is a town in New Haven County, Connecticut, United States. The population was 5,297 at the 2020 census.

History
Bethany was first settled in 1717, but it was not until May 1832 that Bethany separated from Woodbridge to become incorporated as a town. This slightly remote, sparsely populated, residential town retains its rural character. There is some dairying and agriculture. The town is dotted with reservoirs serving Naugatuck and, principally, New Haven.

There have been inhabitants in Bethany since before 1638, predominantly Naugatucks of the Paugusset tribe and Mattabessitts of the Wanguck tribe. The first European settlers arrived in the area around April 1638, creating the towns of Milford and New Haven, with their boundary split down the middle of what is now Bethany. The area of the boundary was settled in 1678, twelve years after New Haven County was organized. In 1717, the Amity Parish was accepted by the General Assembly of the Connecticut Colony and in 1832, Bethany was incorporated as a town. The town is named after the biblical place.

In the mid-to-late 19th century, the population of the town and the land decreased as parts were annexed by the neighboring town of Woodbridge and the new town of Beacon Falls was incorporated into the general geography of Connecticut. The population would continue to decrease until about the 1940s, when the population would spike.

In 1923, the Bethany Airport opened up, one of the first in New England. Soon after, Troop I of the Boy Scouts of America (now known as Troop 931) was chartered in Bethany, and an organized police staff and volunteer fire fighter organization were founded. In 1954, a senior high school was built in Woodbridge to serve Woodbridge, Bethany, and Orange. Earlier Bethany students had been sent to public high schools in neighboring towns as tuition students for grades nine through twelve. In 1963, Amity Junior High School was created in Bethany.

In 1970, Bethany Community School was finished, replacing most of the single roomed schools. The layout composes of a main campus, and two four roomed schools, built in 1934. After the 1975 Ontario School shooting, they discontinued the four roomed schools for educational and safety reasons. 

In 2007, Bethany was named Connecticut's #1 Small Town by Connecticut Magazine.

Town seal
Bethany's town seal is a circle within which appears a circle of rope. In the upper aspects of the seal appear the words TOWN OF BETHANY CONNECTICUT in two curved lines of print bordering the inner aspect of the rope circle. On the bottom of the seal also bordering the inner aspect of the rope circle appear the words INCORPORATED 1832. These words form the top and bottom edges of a third circle, the sides of which are made of a string of inverted oak leaves on each side. A roadway bisecting the seal and extending from bottom to center is pictured within the innermost circle. Surrounded by trees are Christ Episcopal Church pictured on the right, and First Church of Christ Congregational with carriage shed on the left. The Town Seal was created by local artist and Bethany resident, Betsy Seaton, as part of Bethany's 150th anniversary celebration in 1982.

Police 
Currently, Bethany has a single police officer who is hired by the town. This along with the State Police Troop I station serve to protect the town and local area. The barracks located next to the Station remains abandoned and in a state of disrepair.

Geography

Demographics

As of the 2010 Census Bethany had a population of 5,563.  The racial composition of the population was 91.6% white, 1.9% black or African American, 4.8% Asian, 0.6% other races and 1.1% from two or more races.  2.5% of the population was Hispanic or Latino of any race.
  
As of the census of 2000, there were 5,040 people, 1,755 households, and 1,449 families residing in the town. The racial makeup of the town was 95.04% White, 1.83% African American, 0.30% Native American, 1.53% Asian, 0.10% Pacific Islander, 0.48% from other races, and 0.73% from two or more races. Hispanic or Latino of any race were 2.02% of the population.

There were 1,755 households, out of which 40.2% had children under the age of 18 living with them, 73.8% were married couples living together, 6.6% had a female householder with no husband present, and 17.4% were non-families. 13.5% of all households were made up of individuals, and 5.5% had someone living alone who was 65 years of age or older.  The average household size was 2.87 and the average family size was 3.18.

In the town, the population was spread out, with 27.3% under the age of 18, 4.6% from 18 to 24, 27.4% from 25 to 44, 28.4% from 45 to 64, and 12.3% who were 65 years of age or older.  The median age was 41 years. For every 100 females, there were 99.5 males.  For every 100 females age 18 and over, there were 95.1 males.

The median income for a household in the town was $74,898, and the median income for a family was $79,493. Males had a median income of $52,037 versus $44,427 for females. The per capita income for the town was $31,403.  About 1.5% of families and 2.6% of the population were below the poverty line, including 4.1% of those under age 18 and 0.6% of those age 65 or over.

Parks and recreation
In a span of two years (1997–1999), the town purchased  of land for the new Veterans Memorial Park. In 1999, the man-made Hockanum Lake at Veterans Memorial Park was opened for swimming. In 2000, the first Summer Sparkler was held there.

Notable people

 Amy Arnsten, neuroscientist
 Robert Crabtree, chemist
 David Hoadley (1774–1839), architect who worked in New Haven and Middlesex counties in Connecticut; designed Darius Beecher House in Bethany
 Silas Hoadley (1786–1870), clockmaker; born in Bethany
 R. W. B. Lewis (1917–2002), biographer and Yale professor
 Quincy Porter (1897–1966), Pulitzer Prize-winning American composer
 Katharine Weber, novelist

References

External links
 

 
 Town of Bethany official website
 Profile for Bethany, Connecticut, at ePodunk.com
 The Amity Star, a newspaper published in Bethany from 1950 to 1953
 Bethany Historical Society

 
Towns in New Haven County, Connecticut
Populated places established in 1717
Towns in the New York metropolitan area
Towns in Connecticut
1717 establishments in the Thirteen Colonies